The coat of arms of the SSR of Abkhazia was adopted in 1925 when the SSR Abkhazia ratified its constitution. The coat of arms was used until 1931 when SSR Abkhazia was transformed into the Abkhaz Autonomous Soviet Socialist Republic.

History

First version 
The first coat of arms of the SSR of Abkhazia was similar to the coat of arms of the Russian SFSR. The Emblem was adopted in 1921. The coat of arms contains the motto "Workers of all countries unite" in Russian, surrounded by Russian inscriptions "Сов. Соц. Республика Абхазии".

Second version 
The III All-Abkhazian Congress of Soviets, held from March 26 to April 1, 1925, adopted the Basic Law (Constitution) of the Soviet Socialist Republic of Abkhazia, in which the coat of arms was written in Article 115:

Third version 
Since 1926, the inscription "ССР Аҧсны" in the Abkhaz language has been moved from the central image to the circular red border and duplicated in Russian (ССР Абхазия) and Georgian (საბჭოთა სრა), like the slogan "Proletarians of all countries, unite!".

This change was fixed by a revised edition of the Constitution of the SSR of Abkhazia, adopted at the Fourth All-Abkhazian Congress of Soviets in March 1927. The coat of arms is described in Article 101:

Gallery

See also
Flag of the SSR Abkhazia
Emblem of Abkhazia

External links
 
 https://web.archive.org/web/20070103190838/http://dp.abhazia.com/geraldika.html

Abkhazian SSR
History of Abkhazia
National symbols of Abkhazia